Aleks Pluskowski is a Professor of Archaeology at the University of Reading. His areas of research include the environmental archaeology of medieval Europe, especially zooarchaeology, ecology, biodiversity and human-animal relations.

Pluskowski is the principal investigator for the European Research Council-funded project "The Environmental Impact of Conquest and Colonisation in the Medieval Baltic".

Selected publications

References

External links 
 Baltic Crusades, BBC Radio 4, In Our Time link. Aleks Pluskowski on the panel with Nora Berend and Martin Palmer.

British archaeologists
Academics of the University of Reading